The 1995 Speedway Grand Prix of Austria was the second race of the 1995 Speedway Grand Prix season. It took place on 17 June in the ÖAMTC Zweigverein Stadium in Wiener Neustadt, Austria.

Starting positions draw 

The Speedway Grand Prix Commission nominated Franz Leitner as Wild Card. Josh Larsen was replaced by Peter Karlsson.
Draw 18.  (9) Josh Larsen →  (19) Peter Karlsson

Heat details

The intermediate classification

See also 
 Speedway Grand Prix of Austria
 Speedway Grand Prix
 List of Speedway Grand Prix riders

References

External links 
 FIM-live.com
 SpeedwayWorld.tv

Speedway Grand Prix of Austria
A
1995